Carmenta mimuli, the coronopus borer, is a moth of the family Sesiidae. The dark form is the typical form and is found in Arizona. The whitish form is non-typical and is known from the south-western United States, from Kansas to Arizona.

Adults are on wing from late April to November in south-eastern Arizona.

The larvae feed on perennial Solanaceae plants.

References

External links
mothphotographersgroup

Sesiidae
Moths described in 1881